David Ahmad Nesbitt (born February 10, 1991) is a Bahamian professional basketball player that currently plays for Boca Juniors of the Liga Nacional de Básquet. At a height of 2.05 m (6' 8") tall, and a weight of 106 kg (234 lbs.) he plays at the power forward position.

College career
After playing college basketball at Grayson College, from 2008 to 2009, Nesbitt played college basketball at St. Thomas University, with the St. Thomas Bobcats, from 2009 to 2012.

Professional career
Nesbitt won the top-tier level Brazilian League championship with C.A. Paulistano, in 2018. He joined Corinthians in 2019. Nesbitt averaged 12.5 points, 6.5 rebounds, 1.7 assists and 1.0 steal per game. On August 15, 2020, he signed with Minas. He averaged 10.4 points, 5.5 rebounds, and 1.7 assists per game. On July 29, 2021, Nesbitt signed with Boca Juniors of the Liga Nacional de Básquet.

National team career
Nesbitt represented the senior Bahamian national basketball team at the 2016 Centrobasket, where he recorded the most minutes played for his team. He was also the Bahamas' best three point shooter during the tournament.

References

External links
 FIBA Profile
 New Basket Brazil Profile 
 Eurobasket.com Profile
 RealGM.com Profile
 DraftExpress.com Profile
 ESPN Profile
 St. Thomas NCAA College Bio

1991 births
Living people
Al-Mina'a basketball players
Bahamian expatriates in Iraq
Bahamian expatriate basketball people in the United States
Bahamian men's basketball players
Ciclista Olímpico players
Club Atlético Goes basketball players
Club Athletico Paulistano basketball players
Flamengo basketball players
Sport Club Corinthians Paulista basketball players
Novo Basquete Brasil players
Grayson College alumni
Junior college men's basketball players in the United States
Power forwards (basketball)
Shooting guards
Small forwards
St. Thomas Bobcats men's basketball players
Minas Tênis Clube basketball players